Events in the year 2017 in Kosovo.

Incumbents 
 President: Hashim Thaçi
 Prime Minister: Isa Mustafa (until 9 September) Ramush Haradinaj (from 9 September)

Events 

 11 June – The 2017 Kosovan parliamentary election took place.
 9 September – Ramush Haradinaj became the next Prime Minister of the nation, leading a coalition government.
 22 October – The 2017 Kosovan local elections took place.

Deaths 

 21 August – Bajram Rexhepi, politician (b. 1954).

See also 

 2017 in Europe

References 

 
Kosovo
Kosovo
2010s in Kosovo
Years of the 21st century in Kosovo